ZDFtheaterkanal was a TV station and part of the digital TV package offered by ZDF. The channel was broadcast daily from 9 am until 2 am the following day, starting on 9 December 1999. The broadcasting was stopped on 7 May 2011 in favor of ZDFkultur.

The program was broadcast nationwide via the TV cable network (DVB-C) and the Astra 19.2°E (DVB-S).

In the summer of 2008, plans were presented to convert ZDFtheaterkanal into a cultural channel. On 7 May 2011, at 6:30 am, the new channel ZDFkultur started and replaced ZDFtheaterkanal to cover the topics of music, performing arts, film culture, network culture and gaming. The cut-over took place on 7 May 2011 at 1:20 AM.

ZDFtheaterkanal (as well as the following station ZDFkultur) was directed by Wolfgang Bergmann, previously by Walter Konrad.

Programming
The channel broadcast a program that took into account all areas of the performing arts. These included the broadcasting of stagings, documentaries, portraits and interviews. Since the mid-2000s, the program has been supplemented by other art forms. Thus, music formats such as Later with Jools Holland or concert recordings were broadcast.

Also, ZDF-produced Arte and 3sat programs were rebroadcast, including Kulturzeit, Durch die Nacht mit …, Bauerfeind and FOYER.

You could also see older shows like ZDF-Hitparade and Disco as well as occasionally older television series.

Programming
 Simpsons (Die Simpsons)
Anne (Das Anna)
DW Journal (Dw)

References

External links
 

Publicly funded broadcasters
Defunct television channels in Germany
Television channels and stations established in 1999
Television channels and stations disestablished in 2011
1999 establishments in Germany
2011 disestablishments in Germany
Mass media in Mainz
ZDF